Thomas Dulorme Cordero (born January 29, 1990) is a Puerto Rican professional boxer who challenged for the WBO light welterweight title in 2015.

Early life and amateur career 
Dulorme was born on the island of Saint Martin and lived there until the age of 3, when his family moved to Puerto Rico. His father is a native of Saint Martin, and his mother is of Puerto Rican descent. His family later briefly moved to the Dominican Republic before eventually settling back in Puerto Rico when he was 8 years old. He began boxing at an early age, winning Golden Gloves tournaments in Saint Martin, Dominican Republic and Puerto Rico. According to Dulorme, his amateur record was 140–2. Dulorme's younger brother, Starling Cordero, is also a boxer.

Dulorme identifies himself as Puerto Rican, stating his desire to "represent Puerto Rico every time that [he] steps in a ring". Dulorme subsequently became one of the founding members of Gary Shaw, Lou Dibella and Universal Promotion's Team Puerto Rico, a stable composed of several high-profile prospects, including amateur world medalist and WBC Youth World Champion José Pedraza.

Professional career 
Although he struggled in his professional debut against David Rodriguez, Dulorme was able to string together a streak of 10 straight knockouts, capped by the stoppage of Harrison Cuello on the undercard of the Andre Berto vs. Victor Ortiz bout.

Dulorme vs. Corley 
On June 10, 2011 Dulorme beat former welterweight titleholder DeMarcus "Chop Chop" Corley via a near-shutout unanimous decision, dropping the veteran fighter in the third round.

Dulorme vs. Ambriz 
On February 18, 2012 Dulorme made an appearance on the ShoBox: The New Generation series, beating late sub Aris Ambriz via first-round knockout.

Dulorme vs. James 
On August 8, 2020, Dulorme, ranked #10 by the WBA at welterweight fought the #5 ranked Jamal James. Dulorme lost the fight via unanimous decision, with all three judges scoring the fight 117-111, 116-112 and 115-113 in favor of James.

Dulorme vs. Stanionis 
In his next bout, Dulorme, ranked #14 by the WBA fought Eimantas Stanionis, ranked #10 by the WBA at the time. Stanionis won the fight via unanimous decision winning 117-111, 116-112 and 115-113 on the scorecards.

Dulorme vs. Ennis 
In his next fight, Dulorme fought Jaron Ennis, who was ranked #7 by The Ring, #3 by the IBF, #5 by the WBO and WBA and #6 by the WBC at welterweight. Dulorme lost the fight via a first-round knockout.

Professional boxing record

Titles in boxing
Minor Sanctioning Bodies:
NABA USA Welterweight Champion (147 lbs)
NABF Welterweight Champion (147 lbs)
NABF Light Welterweight Champion (140 lbs)
WBO NABO Light Welterweight Champion (140 lbs)

References

External links 

Thomas Dulorme - Profile, News Archive & Current Rankings at Box.Live

1990 births
Living people
People from Carolina, Puerto Rico
Saint Martinois people
Welterweight boxers
Puerto Rican male boxers
Puerto Rican people of Saint Martinois descent
Saint Martinois people of Puerto Rican descent